Theodore Miller (May 16, 1816 – August 18, 1895) was an American lawyer and politician from New York.

Life
Born in Hudson, Columbia County, New York, he was admitted to the bar in 1837. He was District Attorney of Columbia County from 1843 to 1847.

He was a justice of the New York Supreme Court (3rd District) from 1861 to 1874, and ex officio a judge of the Court of Appeals in 1868.

In 1874, he was elected on the Democratic ticket a judge of the New York Court of Appeals, and remained on the bench until the end of 1886 when he reached the constitutional age limit of 70 years.

Personal life and death
Miller died in Hudson at the age of 79.

Sources
 Court of Appeals judges
OBITUARY RECORD.; Theodore Miller in NYT on August 19, 1895
The New York Civil List compiled by Franklin Benjamin Hough (page 372; Weed, Parsons and Co., 1858)

1816 births
1895 deaths
People from Hudson, New York
Judges of the New York Court of Appeals
County district attorneys in New York (state)
New York Supreme Court Justices
19th-century American judges